Notagonum albertisi is a species of ground beetle in the subfamily Platyninae. It was described by Maindron in 1906.

References

Notagonum
Beetles described in 1906